Boulenophrys cheni is a species of frog in the family Megophryidae. It is endemic to the middle Luoxiao Mountains at the border of Jiangxi and Hunan provinces in south-eastern China. Its specific name honours Chen Chunquan, former director of the Jinggang National Nature Reserve.

Description
Males measure  and females  in snout–vent length. The snout is short. The tympanum is distinct or indistinct, partly hidden by the swollen, light-coloured supratympanic fold. The skin of upper surfaces and flanks is smooth with tubercles; tubercles usually form dorsolateral rows, with a weak, X-shaped ridge between them, and four–five transverse rows on shanks. There is a small, horn-like tubercle at the edge of the eyelid. Ventral surface is smooth. Colouration above is red brown or olive brown, with the dorsum bearing a dark, reticular marking.

Males have a single vocal sac. Based on calling males, reproductive season is April–September. Tadpoles are unknown.

Distribution and habitat
This newly described species is known from three locations on the Luoxiao Mountains: Jingzhushan (the type locality) on the Jinggang Mountains in Jiangxi, and Dayuan and Lishuzhou, both in the Yanling Taoyuandong National Nature Reserve, Hunan. It lives in mountainous swamps surrounded by subtropical moist evergreen broadleaf forests at elevations of  asl.

Two other Boulenophrys species occur in the area, but the three species differ in their habitats: Boulenophrys jinggangensis live in slow-moving streams at  asl, and Boulenophrys lini in rushing streams at  asl. The species also differ in the characteristics of the male advertisement calls.

References

cheni
Frogs of China
Endemic fauna of China
Amphibians described in 2014